Noel Hickey (10 January 1925 – 1 October 1996) was an  Australian rules footballer who played with Hawthorn in the Victorian Football League (VFL).

Notes

External links 

1925 births
1996 deaths
Australian rules footballers from Victoria (Australia)
Hawthorn Football Club players